Chung Jae-hun (born 1 June 1974) is an archer from South Korea.

He competed for South Korea at the 1992 Summer Olympics held in Barcelona, Spain in the individual event where he finished in second place behind Frenchman Sebastien Flute. He was also part of the South Korean team that finished fifth in the team event.

External links
 
 

1974 births
South Korean male archers
Olympic archers of South Korea
Olympic silver medalists for South Korea
Archers at the 1992 Summer Olympics
Living people
Olympic medalists in archery
Asian Games medalists in archery
Archers at the 1994 Asian Games
World Archery Championships medalists
Medalists at the 1992 Summer Olympics
Asian Games gold medalists for South Korea
Asian Games silver medalists for South Korea
Medalists at the 1994 Asian Games
20th-century South Korean people
21st-century South Korean people